The Sukhoi Su-29 is a Russian two-seat aerobatic aircraft with a 268 kW (360 hp) radial engine. It was designed based on the Su-26 and inherited most of the design and technical features of its predecessor. Due to wide use of composite materials, which make up as much as 60% of the Su-29's aircraft structure, the empty weight is increased by only 50 kg (110 lb) over the single-seat Su-26's empty weight.

The Su-29 is used for initial pilot aerobatics education, flight training, and participation of pilots in aerobatics competitions and air shows, as well as for maintaining flight skills of military and civil pilots.

Operators

Argentine Air Force ordered eight Su-29ARs to equip the Cruz del Sur (Southern Cross) aerobatic team.

Flying Bulls
 
DOSAAF
 
Czech aerobatic team

Specifications (Su-29)

See also

References

Further reading

External links

Su-29 Pilot's Guide (in Russian)

Aerobatic aircraft
Su-29
1990s Soviet and Russian sport aircraft
Low-wing aircraft
Single-engined tractor aircraft
Conventional landing gear
Aircraft first flown in 1991